Rhynchanthus bluthianus is a species in the ginger family, Zingiberaceae. It was first described by Ludwig Wittmack.

Range
Rhynchanthus bluthianus is native to Burma.

References 

Zingiberoideae